Les Trente Glorieuses ('The Glorious Thirty') was a thirty-year period of economic growth in France between 1945 and 1975, following the end of the Second World War. The name was first used by the French demographer Jean Fourastié, who coined the term in 1979 with the publication of his book Les Trente Glorieuses, ou la révolution invisible de 1946 à 1975 ('The Glorious Thirty, or the Invisible Revolution from 1946 to 1975'). The term is derived from Les Trois Glorieuses ('The Glorious Three'), the three days of revolution on 27–29 July 1830 in France.

As early as 1944, Charles de Gaulle introduced a dirigiste economic policy, which included substantial state-directed control over a capitalist economy. This was followed by thirty years of unprecedented growth, known as the Trente Glorieuses. Over this thirty-year period, France's economy grew rapidly like economies of other developed countries within the framework of the Marshall Plan, such as West Germany, Italy and Japan.

From 1946 to 1950, France, paralyzed by an obsolete economy and infrastructures, did not achieve real growth and living conditions remained very difficult after the war and the penury which resulted from it: the cost of living rose. Rationing, present until 1947-1948, and the housing crisis, accentuated the problems of a people still scarred by World War II.

These decades of economic prosperity combined high productivity with high average wages and high consumption, and were also characterized by a highly developed system of social benefits. According to various studies, the real purchasing power of the average French worker's salary went up by 170% between 1950 and 1975, while overall private consumption increased by 174% in the period 1950–74.

The French standard of living, which had been damaged by both World Wars, became one of the world's highest. The population also became far more urbanized; many rural départements experienced a population decline while the larger metropolitan areas grew considerably, especially that of Paris. Ownership of various household goods and amenities increased considerably, while the wages of the French working class rose significantly as the economy became more prosperous. As noted by the historians Jean Blondel and Donald Geoffrey Charlton in 1974,

If it is still the case that France lags in the number of its telephones, working-class housing has improved beyond recognition and the various 'gadgets' of the consumer society–from television to motor cars–are now purchased by the working class on an even more avid basis than in other Western European countries.

Up until the 1973 oil crisis, the French economy had been faring smoothly.  under François Mitterrand and Jacques Chirac. The oil shock had signified the end of this period of explosive growth.

In his book Capital in the Twenty-First Century, French economist Thomas Piketty describes the Trente Glorieuses as an exceptional 'catch up' period following the two world wars. He cites statistics showing that normal growth in wealthy countries is about 1.5–2%, whereas in Europe growth dropped to 0.5% between 1913 and 1950, and then 'caught up' with a growth rate of 4% between 1950 and 1970, until settling back to 1.5–2% from 1970 onward.

See also
Economic history of France
Japanese post-war economic miracle 
Miracolo economico
Post–World War II economic expansion
Record years 
Spanish miracle
Wirtschaftswunder

References

Further reading
 
 Volkmar Lauber, The political economy of France: from Pompidou to Mitterrand (Praeger Publishers, 1983).

1940s economic history
1950s economic history
1960s economic history
1970s economic history
1940s in France
1950s in France
1960s in France
1970s in France
Contemporary French history
Economic history of France
Economic booms
Post–World War II economic booms

es:Treinta gloriosos